María Dolores Pedrares Alonso (born January 17, 1973 in Tuy, Pontevedra) is a retired female hammer thrower from Spain. She set her personal best (67.14 metres) on June 26, 2004 at a meet in Valladolid. Pedrares is a four-time national champion in the women's hammer throw event with straight victories from 1999 to 2002.

Competition record

References

1973 births
Living people
Spanish female hammer throwers
Competitors at the 1999 Summer Universiade
Competitors at the 2001 Summer Universiade
World Athletics Championships athletes for Spain
Athletes (track and field) at the 2005 Mediterranean Games
Mediterranean Games competitors for Spain